The boys' 1000 metres in short track speed skating at the 2012 Winter Youth Olympics was held on 18 January at the Eisschnelllaufbahn Innsbruck.

Results 
 QAB – qualified for the semifinals A/B
 QCD – qualified for the semifinals C/D
 DNF – did not finish

Quarterfinals

Semifinals

Semifinals C/D 
 QC – qualified for Final C
 QD – qualified for Final D

Semifinals A/B 
 QA – qualified for Final A
 QB – qualified for Final B
 DNF – did not finish

Finals 
 PEN – penalty

Final D

Final C

Final B

Final A

References 

Boys' 1000m